Paul Dobson is an English-Canadian voice actor who works for various studios in Vancouver, British Columbia, Canada.

He performed Naraku and Myoga from Inuyasha, Doctor Doom from Fantastic Four: World's Greatest Heroes, Juggernaut from X-Men: Evolution, Happosai from Ranma ½, Enzo Matrix from ReBoot, Folken Fanel from the Ocean dub of Escaflowne, Zarbon from the Ocean dub of Dragon Ball Z, Graveheart from Shadow Raiders, various characters from several Transformers series (Beast Machines, Armada, Energon and Cybertron), Moo from Monster Rancher, Graham Aker from Mobile Suit Gundam 00 series, Sensei Wu from Lego Ninjago: Masters of Spinjitzu and various voices in Warhammer 40,000: Dawn of War video game series.

Personal life
Paul Dobson is the second of the three Dobson brothers. His older brother Michael Dobson and younger brother Brian Dobson are also voice actors.

Filmography

Animation

Anime

Films

Live-action

Video games

References

External links

20th-century Canadian male actors
21st-century Canadian male actors
Living people
Canadian male video game actors
Canadian male voice actors
Male actors from Vancouver
Year of birth missing (living people)